The following is a list of monarchs of Arakan, starting from the Lemro period. For monarchs from earlier periods, see List of early and legendary monarchs of Burma.

Lemro (818–1430)
Unless otherwise noted, the regnal dates in this section are abbreviated to the first Western calendar year only although the Burmese calendar straddles the Western calendar. For example, the start of King Khittathin's reign, 380 ME (26 March 1018 to 25 March 1019 CE), is shown here only as 1018 (instead of 1018/19). While Arakanese Chronicles shows the dates of reign of Khittathin are from 818 (26 March 180 to 25 March 828 CE).

Pyinsa(818–1103)

Parein(1103–1167)

Hkrit (1167–1180)

Nyeinzara Toungoo (1180–1237)

Launggyet (1251–1406)

Interregnum (1406–1429)

North Arakan
{| width=100% class="wikitable"
|-
! style="background-color:#B9D1FF" width=10% | Name
! style="background-color:#B9D1FF" width=5% | Image
! style="background-color:#B9D1FF" width=10% | Reign From
! style="background-color:#B9D1FF" width=10% | Reign Until
! style="background-color:#B9D1FF" width=10% | Relationship with predecessor(s)
|-
| Anawrahta
|
| after 29 November 1406
| March 1408
| Ava's vassal
|-
| Min Khayi or Min Saw Mon
|
| March 1408
| early 1411
| Hanthawaddy's vassal  Min Khayi per Rakhine Razawin Thit; Min Saw Mon, per Razadarit Ayedawbon
|-
| Thray Sithu
|
| 1408 [sic]
| 1409 [sic]
| Vassal ruler of Ava per Rakhine Razawin Thit'''; Not found in Burmese chronicles, which say Arakan was not under Ava rule during this period
|-
| Letya
|
| early 1411
| early 1412
| Governor-general of North Arakan (Ava's vassal)
|-
| Naranu
|
| 1412
| 18 April 1429
| Ruler at Launnggyet (Hanthawaddy's vassal to 1421)
|-
| Kyaswa
| 
| 1413
| 1416
| Ruler at Khway-Thin Taung (Ava's vassal) according to Rakhine Razawin Thit'; not found in Burmese chronicles
|}

Sandoway (Thandwe)

Mrauk-U (1429–1785)

The reign dates are per the Arakanese chronicle Rakhine Razawin Thit'' (Sandamala Linkara Vol. 2 1931), converted into Western dates using (Eade 1989). (Some Arakanese chronicles state the foundation of the kingdom a year later, 1430. Moreover, the end of the kingdom is given per Burmese records, 2 January 1785. Arakanese records give a day earlier, 1 January 1785.)

See also
 List of Burmese monarchs
 List of heirs to the Burmese thrones

References

Bibliography

External sources
 
 
 

.01
Lists of Burmese monarchs